KOKC may refer to:

 The code for the National Weather Service station in Oklahoma City, Oklahoma, United States
 The ICAO code for Will Rogers World Airport, in Oklahoma City, Oklahoma, United States
 KOKC (AM), a radio station (1520 AM) licensed to Oklahoma City, Oklahoma, United States